The Morning Journal is the name of a Lisbon, Ohio, newspaper circulated in Columbiana County, Ohio, and environs.

External links
 

Newspapers published in Ohio
Columbiana County, Ohio